Vancimuglio is a frazione of the comune of Grumolo delle Abbadesse, in the province of Vicenza, Veneto, northern Italy.

It is the location of Andrea Palladio's Villa Chiericati.

References 

Cities and towns in Veneto